The National Underclassmen Combine/NUC Sports is a professional, privately owned recruiting program and three-day training and assessment function for high school football players to display their skills and potential. It is one of the largest and most successful programs of its kind, the purpose of which is to connect talented football athletes with collegiate programs willing to offer them a scholarship. Notable players to go through the system include Joe Haden, cornerback for the NFL's Cleveland Browns, and Marcus Lattimore, star running back for the University of South Carolina. Founded by former University of Connecticut linebacker David Schuman, the first combine event was held in New Jersey in 2005.

Philosophy and objectives

According to ESPN recruiting analyst Jamie Newberg, “Combines … are platforms for kids to get initially identified, for young kids to emerge, etc.” Dave Schuman, the founder of National Underclassmen Combine, observes that college football programs are now looking to younger students as potential recruits. Previously, a football player would not have to consider his options for playing collegiate football until his senior year. Now many elite programs are extending scholarship offers to students at the beginning of their junior years of high school.

Combine structure

A typical weekend combine organized by National Underclassmen is a three-day event. The first day consists of preparatory events: combine prep training, positions skill training and All American recruiting. Day 2 includes the actual combines: tests of athletic ability and football-specific skills. Seventh through ninth graders participate in the morning, while sophomores and juniors work out during the afternoon...

The tests and drills on day two of the combine allow athletes to gauge their abilities against competition. Standard drills include the 40-yard dash, shuttle run, bench press and vertical leap. National Underclassmen Combine also administers position-specific drills, such as throwing strength and accuracy, catching ability, and offensive and defensive line work.

Day three consists of special events such as a 7-on-7 tournament and “trench warfare” for linesmen. Additionally, an awards ceremony for the most exceptional athletes of the weekend is held at the end of day three. Event managers hand out the overall MVP (most valuable player) award and positional MVP awards, as well as a number of other awards, including Strongest Man and Combine King.

The top participants from all of the national combines are invited to take part in the regional Ultimate 100 camps. According to the National Underclassmen website, 50 percent of those invited to an Ultimate 100 camp go on to play college football at the Division 1 or 1aa level. The format of these camps is similar to the standard National Underclassmen weekend combine. The first Ultimate 100 camp was held in 2006.

Combine recruiting process

No explicit eligibility criteria exist, but participants must compete within their age group. NUC is the longest running underclassmen event and it's the most respected high school combine and football camp in the country. If you're serious about taking your game to the next level, playing college football or getting early exposure to college recruiters then attend an NUC Recruiting Event. NUC Sports has Combines, Showcases, Invite Only Camps, All Star Games, and 7 on 7 Tournaments. All NUC Sports Recruiting Events are in place to help the Athletes compete, get noticed, get exposure and get recruited.

Results are made available to college coaches in the form of a report. Major sports sites such as ESPN.com and Rivals.com also regularly cover news from the combines.

Issues with recruitment of young athletes

The recruitment of young players is not without controversy. Some coaches and parents worry that, just as in the classroom, some athletes may not “test” well and therefore have a blemish on their recruiting record, not to mention the potential psychological damage of falling short of their goals. Others have expressed concern that combines are too expensive for some families.

Notable players from National Underclassmen Combine

Many combine participants go on to play football at the collegiate level while earning a degree. A few continue to play football at the professional level in the National Football League. Noteworthy players to matriculate through the National Underclassmen Combine system include:
 Tajh Boyd (quarterback, Clemson)
 Tyler Bray (quarterback, Tennessee)
 Rex Burkhead (running back, Nebraska, New England Patriots)
 Landon Collins (safety, Alabama, New York Giants)
 Amari Cooper (Wide Receiver, Alabama, Oakland Raiders)
 Ray Graham (running back, Pittsburgh)
 Joe Haden (cornerback, Florida, Cleveland Browns)
 Terry Hawthorne (defensive back, Illinois)
 Justin Hunter (wide receiver, Tennessee)
 James Hurst  (offensive line, North Carolina)
 Tony Jefferson (defensive back, Oklahoma, Baltimore Ravens)
 Jelani Jenkins (linebacker, Florida, Miami Dolphins)
 Collin Klein (quarterback, Kansas St)
 Marcus Lattimore (running back, University of South Carolina)
 Corey Lemonier (defensive line, Auburn)
 Colt Lyerla (Tight End, Oregon)
 Johnny Manziel (Quarterback, Texas A & M)
 Marcus Mariota (Quarterback, Oregon, Tennessee Titans)
 Corey Moore (safety, Georgia, Houston Texans)
 Aaron Murray (quarterback, Georgia)
 Danny O'Brien (quarterback, Wisconsin)
 Alex Okafor (defensive line, Texas, New Orleans Saints)
 Casey Pachall (quarterback, Texas Christian University)
 Kenny Stills (wide receiver, Oklahoma, Miami Dolphins)
 Ryan Swope (wide receiver, Texas A & M, Arizona Cardinals)
 Tyrod Taylor (quarterback, Virginia Tech, Buffalo Bills)
 Mason Walters (offensive line, Texas)
 James White (running back, Wisconsin, New England Patriots)
 Robert Woods (wide receiver, University of Southern California, Buffalo Bills)
 Derrick Henry (running back, Alabama, Tennessee Titans)
 Minkah Fitzpatrick (cornerback, Alabama)
 Rashan Gary (defensive tackle, Michigan)
 Malachi Dupre (wide receiver, LSU, Buffalo Bills)
 Laremy Tunsil (tackle, Mississippi, Miami Dolphins)
 Steve Beauharnais (linebacker, Rutgers)
 Gabe Wright (defensive line, Auburn, Miami Dolphins)
 DeAndré Washington (running back, Texas Tech, Oakland Raiders)
 Jhurell Pressley (running back, New Mexico, Atlanta Falcons)
 David Sills (American football) (wide receiver, West Virginia)
 David Andrews (center, Georgia, New England Patriots)
 Marquis Flowers (linebacker, Arizona, New England Patriots)
 Elandon Roberts (linebacker, Houston, New England Patriots)
 Joe Thuney (tackle, North Carolina State, New England Patriots)
 Jordan Jenkins (linebacker, Georgia, New York Jets)
 Darron Lee (linebacker, New York Jets)
 Bryce Petty (quarterback, Baylor, New York Jets)
 Nelson Agholor (wide receiver, USC, Philadelphia Eagles)
 Wendell Smallwood (running back, West Virginia, Philadelphia Eagles)
 Corey Clement (running back, Wisconsin, Philadelphia Eagles)
 Ronald Darby (cornerback, Maryland, Philadelphia Eagles)
 Jalen Mills (cornerback, West Virginia, Philadelphia Eagles)
 Jens Jeters (Linebacker) University of Texas San Antonio, 2-Time NUC Western Regional Linebacker MVP
Conference USA Defensive Player of the Week 9/01/2014

References

External links
 

High school football in the United States